Tsotsi-Yurt (Coci-Evla) is a village (selo) in Kurchaloyevsky District, Chechnya.

Administrative and municipal status 
Municipally, Tsotsi-Yurt is incorporated as Tsotsi-Yurtovskoye rural settlement. It is the administrative center of the municipality and the only settlement included in it.

Geography 

Tsotsi-Yurt is located on both banks of the Khulkhulau River.

The nearest settlements to Tsotsi-Yurt are Dzhalka and Novy Engenoy to the north, Ilaskhan-Yurt to the north-east, Geldagana to the south-east, Avtury to the south, Germenchuk to the south-west, Mesker-Yurt to the west, and the city of Argun to the north-west.

History 
According to legend, the village of Tsotsi-Yurt was founded by a man named Tsotsa, a member of the Meskroy teip.

In 1944, after the genocide and deportation of the Chechen and Ingush people and the Chechen-Ingush ASSR was abolished, the village of Tsotsi-Yurt was renamed to Oktyabrskoye and settled by people from the neighbouring republic of Dagestan.

During the early 1990s, the village regained its old Chechen name, Tsotsi-Yurt.

Population 
 2002 Census: 15,935
 2010 Census: 18,306
 2018 estimate: 20,317

According to the 2010 census, the majority of residents of Tsotsi-Yurt were ethnic Chechens.

Infrastructure 
All of Tsotsi-Yurt is supplied by gas and water pipelines. It lies on the public transport route from Grozny to Kurchaloy.

The village has three schools, several kindergartens and a clinic. There is a small agricultural and industrial economy in the village.

References 

Rural localities in Kurchaloyevsky District